Finch Foundry is a 19th-century water-powered forge situated in the village of Sticklepath near Okehampton, Devon, England. It was originally used to produce agricultural and mining hand tools and at its peak produced around 400 edge-tools a day. It remained an active foundry until 1960 when the roof collapsed  and has been a National Trust property since 1994. It contains examples of a tilt hammer, drop hammer, and shear hammer all powered by water wheels. The Trust maintains the forge in working order and demonstrations of the tools are given.

Gallery

References

External links

Finch Foundry information, National Trust

National Trust properties in Devon
Museums in Devon
Technology museums in the United Kingdom
Foundries in the United Kingdom
Industrial buildings in England
Industrial archaeological sites in Devon
Power hammers